Juliana Barbara Nero (born  14 June 1979) is a Vincentian former cricketer who played as a right-handed batter. Between 2003 and 2013, she played one Test match, 76 One Day Internationals and 45 Twenty20 Internationals for the West Indies, including appearing at the 2005 and 2013 World Cups. She played domestic cricket for Saint Vincent and the Grenadines and Windward Islands.

References

External links

1979 births
Living people
Saint Vincent and the Grenadines women cricketers
West Indies women Test cricketers
West Indies women One Day International cricketers
West Indies women Twenty20 International cricketers
Windward Islands women cricketers